Commonwealth Day (formerly Empire Day) is the annual celebration of the Commonwealth of Nations, since 1977 often held on the second Monday in March. It is marked by an Anglican service in Westminster Abbey, normally attended by the monarch as Head of the Commonwealth along with the Commonwealth Secretary-General and Commonwealth High Commissioners in London. The monarch delivers a broadcast address to the Commonwealth.

While it has a certain official status, Commonwealth Day is not a public holiday in most Commonwealth countries, and there is little public awareness of it. It is marked as a holiday in Gibraltar, but not in March.

History

The idea of a day that would "remind children that they formed part of the British Empire" was conceived in 1897. In 1898, Canadian Clementina Trenholme introduced an Empire Day to Ontario schools, on the last school day before 24 May, Queen Victoria's birthday. Empire Day or Victoria Day was celebrated in the Cape Colony before the Second Boer War and thereafter throughout the Union of South Africa.

Empire Day was introduced in the UK in 1904 by Reginald Brabazon, 12th Earl of Meath, 'to nurture a sense of collective identity and imperial responsibility among young empire citizens'.  In schools, morning lessons were devoted to "exercises calculated to remind (the children) of their mighty heritage". The centrepiece of the day was an organised and ritualistic veneration of the Union flag.  Then, schoolchildren were given the afternoon off, and further events were usually held in their local community.  Empire Day became more of a sombre commemoration in the aftermath of World War I, and politically partisan as the Labour Party passed a resolution in 1926 to prevent the further celebration of Empire Day.

After the death of Queen Victoria on 22 January 1901, her birthday, 24 May, was celebrated from 1902 as Empire Day, though not officially recognised as an annual event until 1916.
In 1925, 90,000 people attended an Empire Day thanksgiving service held at Wembley Stadium as part of the British Empire Exhibition. The British Empire League promoted Empire Day as a patriotic holiday. Empire Day traversed class boundaries, and after the First World War, the jingoism was toned down in favour of sombre commemoration in the festival.

After World War II, the event fell into rapid decline, and Prime Minister Harold Macmillan bowed to the inevitable on 18 December 1958, when he announced in Parliament that the name of Empire Day would be changed forthwith to Commonwealth Day.

In 1973, the National Council in Canada of the Royal Commonwealth Society submitted a proposal to Canadian Prime Minister Pierre Elliot Trudeau that Commonwealth Day should be observed simultaneously throughout the Commonwealth of Nations. The proposal was included in the Canadian items for inclusion in the agenda for the 1975 Commonwealth Heads of Government Meeting. After the meeting, it was agreed that the Commonwealth Secretariat would select a date with no historical connotations so that the entire Commonwealth could use it as a date to celebrate Commonwealth Day. At a meeting in Canberra in May 1976, senior Commonwealth officials agreed on a new fixed date for Commonwealth Day, the second Monday in March.

Observance

There is not a uniform observance of the day worldwide.

United Kingdom

The Union Flag is flown from UK public buildings on the second Monday in March to mark Commonwealth Day. In addition, the Scottish Parliament Building flies the Commonwealth flag. The King and other members of the Royal family attend a special inter-denominational service at Westminster Abbey, followed by a reception hosted by the Commonwealth Secretary-General. A wreath is laid at the Commonwealth Memorial Gates in London to remember the sacrifices of Commonwealth soldiers by the Commonwealth Secretary General. A number of other events, such as the Commonwealth Africa Summit, also take place around the United Kingdom.

British Overseas Territories
Commonwealth Day is a public holiday in Gibraltar, previously held in March. As of 2022, it is celebrated in February instead of March.

The day was also a school holiday in British Hong Kong, prior to the transfer of sovereignty over Hong Kong from the UK to China in 1997.

Australia
Commonwealth Day is not observed as a public holiday in Australia, although several regional public holidays coincide with this day. This includes Canberra Day in the Australian Capital Territory, Labour Day in Victoria, Adelaide Cup Day in South Australia, and Eight-hour Day in Tasmania. 

In 2006, Queen Elizabeth II delivered her Commonwealth Day address from St. Andrew's Cathedral, Sydney, New South Wales, Australia; this formed part of the lead-up to the 2006 Commonwealth Games in Melbourne.

Canada

In Canada, the only official recognition of Commonwealth Day is a federal government stipulation that the Royal Union Flag be flown alongside Canada's flag at government installations nationwide, "where physical arrangements allow... Physical arrangements means the existence of at least two flag poles". The 1964 parliamentary resolutions creating the Maple Leaf flag also retained the Union Flag as an official symbol of Canada's membership in the Commonwealth, and allegiance to the Crown. 

Until 1977, Empire Day/Commonwealth Day was observed on an ad hoc basis in conjunction with Victoria Day, a federal statutory holiday in May that also serves as the sovereign's official birthday in Canada. In 1977, Commonwealth Day was moved to the second Monday in March, in line with the rest of the Commonwealth of Nations.

Tuvalu
In Tuvalu it is an annual public holiday.

Other Commonwealth countries

In Belize and The Bahamas, Commonwealth Day is marked in schools with special programmes and assemblies involving flag-raising ceremonies; the Queen's Commonwealth Day message is often read at such events. 

In Belize, Commonwealth Day is still celebrated on 24 May.

Commonwealth Day themes

See also
 Commonwealth of Nations membership criteria
 Commonwealth Scholarship and Fellowship Plan
 Empire Air Day
 Royal Commonwealth Society
 Territorial evolution of the British Empire

References

External links

 
 Commonwealth Day
 C. 1917 Pathé News view of Empire Day
 1919 Pathé News views of Empire Day
 1920s view of Empire Day
 1922 Pathé News view of Empire Day
 British Movietone News 1930 view of Empire Day
 1931 Pathé News view of Empire Day
 1933 Pathé News view of Empire Day
 1934 Pathé News view of Empire Day
 HM King George VI: Empire Day Address, 24 May 1940
 The Queen's Commonwealth Day Message 2011
 2017 Commonwealth Day Service at Westminster Abbey

Public holidays in the United Kingdom
March observances
Holidays and observances by scheduling (nth weekday of the month)
Day
International observances
International organization days
1898 introductions
Public holidays in Canada
Public holidays in the Bahamas
British flag flying days